Jean-Claude Nallet (born 13 March 1947) is a retired French sprinter that competed in the 1968 Summer Olympics in the 400 m and 4 × 400 m relay and at the 1976 Summer Olympics in the 400 m hurdles  and reached the final in the relay. He won two gold and two silver medals in these events at the European championships of 1969-1974. Nallet retired after finishing sixth in the 400 m hurdles at the 1978 European Athletics Championships. He is married to French Olympic gymnast Chantal Seggiaro.

References

1947 births
Living people
French male sprinters
French male hurdlers
Olympic athletes of France
Athletes (track and field) at the 1968 Summer Olympics
Athletes (track and field) at the 1976 Summer Olympics
European Athletics Championships medalists
Mediterranean Games gold medalists for France
Athletes (track and field) at the 1975 Mediterranean Games
Mediterranean Games medalists in athletics
20th-century French people
21st-century French people